Lisa Sellberg Jensen (born 26 February 1997) is a Danish ice hockey goaltender and member of the Danish national ice hockey team, currently playing with the Malmö Redhawks Dam of the Swedish Damettan.

Jensen represented Denmark in the Division I Group A tournaments of the IIHF Women's World Championship in 2014, 2016, 2017, 2018 and 2019, and in the Top Division tournament in 2021. As a junior player with the Danish national under-18 team, she participated in the 2015 IIHF World Women's U18 Championship – Division I.

References

External links
 

Living people
1997 births
People from Tårnby Municipality
Danish women's ice hockey goaltenders
Danish expatriate ice hockey people
Danish expatriate sportspeople in Sweden
Expatriate ice hockey players in Sweden
Ice hockey players at the 2022 Winter Olympics
Olympic ice hockey players of Denmark
Sportspeople from the Capital Region of Denmark